Samuel Vernon (December 6, 1683 - December 5, 1737) was an early American silversmith, active in Newport, Rhode Island.

Vernon was born in Narragansett, Rhode Island to Daniel and Ann (Dyer) Hutchinson Vernon, and was a direct descendant of Anne Hutchinson. Two of his cousins were also prominent silversmiths: John Coddington of Newport and Edward Winslow of Boston. He married twice: to Elizabeth Fleet of Long Island on April 10, 1707, and to Elizabeth Paine on January 12, 1725. His sons, including William Vernon, were among the most prominent of the Newport Slave Traders.

Vernon apprenticed about 1696, perhaps to John Coney in Boston or to his cousin Edward Winslow. He was made a freeman of Newport in 1714, in 1715 made engravings and printed Rhode Island's paper currency, in 1726 advertised his silver shop north of Goulds Tailors, and in 1733 was commissioned by the General Assembly of the Colony of Rhode Island to create three tankards for New York commissioners Col. Isaac Hicks of Hempstead, James Jackson of Flushing, and Col. Lewis Morris Jr. of Westchester. Vernon was also an active member of his community. In 1728 he was appointed Justice of the Peace in Newport, circa 1729-1737 served as Assistant in General Assembly and assistant to Governor investigating health conditions, and in 1737 served on the Committee to settle a boundary dispute between Massachusetts and New Hampshire.

His work is collected in the Metropolitan Museum of Art, Museum of Fine Arts, Boston, Rhode Island School of Design Museum, Winterthur Museum, and Yale University Art Gallery.

References 
 "Samuel Vernon", American Silversmiths.
 "Tankard by Samuel Vernon", Museum of Fine Arts, Boston.
 "Vernon Cup", Newport Historical Society.
 Dictionary of American Biography, Volume 19, Scribner, 1937, page 251.
 American silver at Winterthur, Ian M. G. Quimby, Dianne Johnson, Henry Francis du Pont Winterthur Museum, 1995, page 170.
 The American Collector: A Monthly Magazine of Collector's Lore, Volumes 1-2, Charles Frederick Heartman, William Newnham Chattin Carlton, Robert J. C. Lingel, Collector Publishing Company, 1925, page 361.
 Rhode Island Colonial Money and Its Counterfeiting, 1647-1726, Richard Le Baron Bowen, Rumford Press, 1942, pages 16–17.
 The Slave Trade: The Story of the Atlantic Slave Trade: 1440-1870, Hugh Thomas, Simon and Schuster, 1997, page 261.

American silversmiths
1683 births
1737 deaths